Radnice is a town in Rokycany District in the Plzeň Region of the Czech Republic. It has about 1,800 inhabitants.

Administrative parts
The village of Svatá Barbora is an administrative part of Radnice.

Geography
It lies in the Plasy Uplands. The Radnický stream flows through the town. Městský Pond is located inside the built-up area.

History
The first written mention of Radnice is from 1336, when King John of Bohemia sold it to the Rosenberg family. In 1478, Radnice was acquired by the Sternberg family. From 1541 to 1620, it was owned by the Czernin family. In 1570, Radnice was promoted to a town by Emperor Maximilian II.

After the Battle of White Mountain, properties of the Czernin family were confiscated, and Radnice changed owners several times. During the Thirty Years' War, the town was looted several times. From 1758 until the abolition of manorialsm, Radnice was again property of the Rosenbergs.

In the 19th century, coal mining developed in vicinity of Radnice igniting industrial development. In 1893, the railway was built. Radnice coal basin was depleted in 1986.

Transport
The railway line leading to Plzeň starts in the town.

Sights
On a hill above the town there is the Chapel of the Visitation of the Virgin Mary, built by Kilian Ignaz Dientzenhofer.

Notable people
Isaac Mayer Wise (1819–1900), American Reform rabbi; worked here in 1843–1846
Joseph Lewi (1820–1897), Jewish physician
Václav Kotva (1922–2004), actor

References

External links

Cities and towns in the Czech Republic
Populated places in Rokycany District
Shtetls